Dworp (Dutch pronunciation: [dʋɔrp]; French: Tourneppe [tuʁnɛp]) is a small town in the municipality of Beersel, south of Brussels in Flanders. Dworp has an area of 9.61 square kilometers. As of January 1, 2002, it has a population of 5,277 inhabitants.

Things to see
 Town Hall with a pillory beside it
 Castle (GravenHof)
 Centre for cultural education Destelheide (hosts yearly the 'zomeracademie' together with the Antwerp-based cultural organisation De Veerman.)
 Camp site for groups

Populated places in Flemish Brabant